MagnaCom is a technology IP license provider based in Israel and Orange County, California.  The company is focused on reducing the bandwidth needed in wired and wireless communications, via the WAM technology, an alternative to Quadrature amplitude modulation The business provides technology to carriers, handset providers, wired and wireless companies, and is embedded in semiconductor chips.

The WAM technology, property of MagnaCom, is aimed to substitute current QAM technology, present in cellular, Wi-Fi, fiber and wire-line broadband connections, which can gain 10 decibel on a signal and 400% in the range of Wi-Fi. The power consumption would also be down by 50%.  This is achieved by a more efficient modulation scheme, carrying more info on the same space, improving speeds. These innovations are aimed towards a better connectivity on 5G cellular networks.

Awards
Electronics 360: 10 startups to follow in 2014
FierceWireless’ Fierce 15: Top Wireless Companies
2015 CES Innovations Awards: Embedded Technologies
Business Intelligence Group's 2015 BIG Innovation Awards: Major Impact in Today's World
ECN Impact Awards: Market Disrupter
Red Herring: Top 100 North America Winner
EE Times ACE Award Finalist: Start Up of the Year http://www.ubm-ace.com/finalists.php

See also
Wave modulation
Qualcomm
QAM modulation

References

External links
 Official website

Companies based in Orange County, California
Semiconductor companies of Israel
Companies based in Petah Tikva
Broadcom
Fabless semiconductor companies